"Dancing in the Dark" is a song originally recorded by Belgian singer Jessy. In 2006, Jessy later worked with British DJ Micky Modelle to produce a remix of the song. The remix was very successful and charted in many countries across Europe, peaking top ten in three.

Formats & track listing

First Release
CD Single
Dancing In The Dark (Radio Mix) 4:15
Dancing In The Dark (Piano Mix) 3:55

Second Release With Micky Modelle
CD Single
Dancing In The Dark (Radio Mix) 4:15
Dancing In The Dark (Source Now Voyager Edit) 3:22
Dancing In The Dark (Radio Edit) 3:24
Dancing In The Dark (Instrumental) 3:23

CD Single (Belgium)
Dancing In The Dark (Source Now Voyager Edit) 3:22
Dancing In The Dark (Radio Edit) 3:24
Dancing In The Dark (Dancing DJs Edit) 4:35

CD Maxi (UK)
Dancing In The Dark (Radio Edit) 3:24
Dancing In The Dark (Source Now Voyager Edit) 3:22
Dancing In The Dark (Extended Mix) 6:27
Dancing In The Dark (Dancing DJs Remix) 6:27
Dancing In The Dark (Alex K Remix) 6:53
Dancing In The Dark (Original Mix) 6:16
Dancing In The Dark (KB Project Remix) 6:31

Music video

A music video for the original song was recorded and can be viewed on her website. The version featuring Micky features Jessy singing in front of lasers, Micky also makes so appearances in the video along with some dancers.

Chart performance
The song debuted at number sixty six on the UK Singles Chart, and went on to peak at number ten. The song stayed inside the top forty of the chart for five weeks. It topped the UK Dance Chart.

In Belgium, the song peaked at number seven on the Ultratip.

In Switzerland, the song also peaked at number twenty five on the Swiss Singles Chart.

In Sweden, "Dancing in the Dark" peaked at number nine on the Swedish Singles Chart.

Charts
 Micky Modelle Remix

External links
 Mickymodelle.com
 Mickymodelle.com Lo-Fi Version
 Jessy Official

2003 singles
2006 singles
Micky Modelle songs
Jessy De Smet songs
Song articles with missing songwriters